James T. McIlwain is an American ophthalmologist currently the Sidney A. and Dorothea Doctors Fox Professor Emeritus at Brown University. He obtained his M.D. degree from Tulane University in 1961.

References

Year of birth missing (living people)
Living people
American ophthalmologists
Tulane University alumni
Brown University faculty